Lyudi Invalidy (Cyrillic: Люди-инвалиды, ; translation: Disabled People) is the second Russian-language studio album by t.A.T.u., released on 21 October 2005 in Russia. It is the Russian-language equivalent of the English-language Dangerous and Moving, though both albums contain a mix of Russian and English tracks. The album was later released in some Eastern European countries, Germany and Mexico. The album was certified Platinum in Russia by NFPF. As of 2021, the album is available for streaming only in some countries.

Album information and production 
Technically, the production for Люди-инвалиды began in 2004. It was during 2004 when t.A.T.u.'s then-producer Ivan Shapovalov introduced the tracks "Люди-инвалиды" (stylized on the rear album cover as "ЛЮДИ ИНВАЛИДЫ"), "Ты согласна", "Ничья", and "Что не хватает" to the girls, and the songs were recorded. For instance, an early version of "Ничья" was played during the Show Me Love Tour. Demos from all four songs were also released to fans, and heard on Поднебесная. After leaving Shapovalov and then taking a hiatus, t.A.T.u. negotiated with Shapovalov and the songwriters and composers to rerecord the songs. The music was changed on all of the songs, and in some the lyrics were altered. When the album was released in 2005, it only credited Shapovalov for the song "Люди-инвалиды".

Demos of "Космос", "Вся моя любовь", and "Обезьянка ноль"—as well as an a cappella version of the last—were released prior to the album's premiere; all were sung by Lena only and were recorded in both Moscow and Los Angeles with Sergio Galoyan from mid-2004 to early 2005.

Differences from Dangerous and Moving

Lyudi Invalidy and Dangerous and Moving effectively have eight tracks in common, either in the form of being the same track or being English/Russian-counterparts:
 "Люди инвалиды" / "Dangerous and Moving" (49-second intro)
 "All About Us"
 "Loves Me Not"
 "Обезьянка ноль"
 "Космос" / "Cosmos (Outer Space)"
 "Ничья" / "We Shout"
 "Новая модель" / "Perfect Enemy"
 "Люди инвалиды" / "Dangerous and Moving" (full version)

Three tracks from Lyudi Invalidy do not have English-language counterparts on Dangerous and Moving:
 "Ты согласна"
 "Вся моя любовь" (An English version, "All My Love", exists in demo form with only Lena singing but was not recorded with both girls)
 "Что не хватает"

Four tracks from Dangerous and Moving do not have Russian-language counterparts and not released on Lyudi Invalidy:
 "Friend or Foe"
 "Gomenasai"
 "Craving"
 "Sacrifice"

The tracks that the two albums have in common were all reordered, with only tracks 1 and 4 being the same between the two; however, the full versions of "Люди инвалиды" / "Dangerous and Moving" are the final tracks of both albums (track 11 on Lyudi Invalidy and track 12 on Dangerous and Moving)

On this album, "Loves Me Not" has different music than the version on Dangerous and Moving. Among other differences, the Lyudi Invalidy version features 29 seconds of instrumentals before the lyrics start, while the Dangerous and Moving version skips straight to the lyrics; and the Dangerous and Moving version features roaring guitars during the chorus, which are absent from the Lyudi Invalidy version.

The girls sing an extra verse in "Cosmos" after the second chorus; in "Космос", this is an instrumental break with no lyrics.

Singles 
In October 2005, "Люди-инвалиды" was released as the lead and only single of the album. Along with "Loves Me Not", "All About Us", "Новaя модель", and "Обезьянка ноль", the track was played on Russian radio during 2005, peaking at number 63 on the Russian Airplay Top Hit 100 chart.

Controversy of Люди-инвалиды 
The title of the album has caused much confusion and controversy. The words "люди-инвалиды" can translate to English as "disabled/handicapped/invalid people", though it is most accurate as invalid people. However, the group on several occasions have stated that the title refers to morally disabled persons, not disability in the physical sense.

In November 2006, Leonid Mikhailovich Vokuyev, Commissioner For Human Rights for the Komi Republic filed a lawsuit against t.A.T.u. claiming that the album and song degraded disabled people. Specifically, they were offended by writing in the booklet (see below) and the lyrics to the song "Lyudi Invalidy".
t.A.T.u. expressed that they were not worried about the lawsuit, and Katina added "Of course, we meant moral invalids, people who do not have soul and human feelings" (see also: philosophical zombie). When asked if they had anything against disabled people, she stated that she finds it offensive to refer to people by that term, and added "We take pictures together and make sure they have priority seats [at concerts]." No more news has been given about the lawsuit and it is assumed to have been dropped.

Booklet 

Below is the text found in the album booklet that had caused controversy:

...ЛЮДИ ИНВАЛИДЫ рождаются такими и такими умирают. Они не знают, что значит быть человеком. Они – подделка на основе человекообразной болванки. У них есть ноги, руки, другие части тела, внешне они неотличимы от людей. Но ЛЮДИ ИНВАЛИДЫ не живут, а функционируют. Их функции описываются законами механики и ещё четырьмя признаками: жестокость, глупость, жадность, подлость.* Любая их деятельность эффективна, предсказуема, тускла и разрушительна. Все плохие, очень плохие и ужасные события – результат деятельности ЛЮДЕЙ ИНВАЛИДОВ. Мы живем среди них и редко замечаем этот большой человеческий fake...

...Disabled people are born that way and will die that way. They don't know what it means to be human. They are an imitation, based on an anthropoid template. They have legs, hands, and other parts of the body; they are physically indistinguishable from humans. But disabled people do not live—they merely function. Their functions are described by the laws of mechanics and by four traits: cruelty, stupidity, greed, meanness. All activity is effective, predictable, dim, and destructive. All bad, very bad, and horrible events are the result of the activities of disabled people. We live among them and rarely notice this big human fake...

Note: The acronym ЖГЖП stands for Жестокость (cruelty), Глупость (stupidity), Жадность (greed), Подлость (meanness). ЖГЖП is also found on some t.A.T.u. merchandise, and it is also on the inner ring of the CD for Lyudi Invalidy.

Track listing 
{{Track listing
| extra_column = Transliteration (Translation)
| total_length = 40:54
| title1 = Люди-инвалиды
| note1 = Intro
| extra1 = Lyudi invalidy (Disabled People)
| length1 = 0:49

| title2 = Новая модель
| note2 = Perfect Enemy
| lyrics2 = V. Polienko
| music2 = S. Galoyan
| extra2 = Novaya model (New Model)
| length2 = 4:12

| title3 = Обезьянка ноль
| note3 = Null and Void
| lyrics3 = Polienko
| music3 = 
| extra3 = Obez'yanka nol''' (Monkey Zero)
| length3 = 4:26

| title4 = Loves Me Not
| lyrics4 = 
| music4 = 
| length4 = 3:14

| title5 = Космос
| note5 = Cosmos (Outer Space)
| lyrics5 = Polienko
| music5 = Galoyan
| extra5 = Kosmos (Cosmos)
| length5 = 4:10

| title6 = Ты согласна
| note6 = 
| lyrics6 = Polienko
| music6 = 
| extra6 = Ty soglasna (You Agree)
| length6 = 3:11

| title7 = Ничья
| note7 = We Shout
| lyrics7 = 
| music7 = Nekkermann
| extra7 = Nich'ya (No One's)
| length7 = 3:05

| title8 = Вся моя любовь
| note8 = 
| lyrics8 = 
| music8 = Galoyan
| extra8 = Vsya moya lyubov (All My Love)
| length8 = 5:48

| title9 = All About Us
| note9 = 
| lyrics9 = 
| length9 = 3:02

| title10 = Что не хватает
| note10 = 
| lyrics10 = I. Demyan
| music10 = Demyan
| extra10 = Chto ne khvataet (What Isn't Enough?)
| length10 = 4:26

| title11 = Люди-инвалиды
| note11 = Dangerous and Moving
| lyrics11 = Polienko
| music11 = I. Shapovalov
| extra11 = Lyudi invalidy (Disabled People)
| length11 = 4:37
}}

Certifications

 See also 

 Dangerous and Moving Tour - The associated tour
 Truth: Live in St. Petersburg''

References 

T.A.T.u. albums
2005 albums
Universal Records albums